William Lowry "Buck" Pressly (December 2, 1886 – September 27, 1954) was an American professional baseball first baseman and manager, and also a physician.

Biography
Pressly was born in Due West, South Carolina, in 1886 and died there in 1954. His father, John Lowry Pressly (1857–1933), was a professor of Greek and Latin at Erskine College. Buck Pressly attended Erskine College and Emory College. He is an inductee of the Erskine College Hall of Fame.

Baseball career
Pressly played in minor league baseball from 1908 to 1914, in 1916 and for one game in 1922. Primarily a first basemen, he spent most of his playing career with the Roanoke Tigers and also suited up for the Norfolk Tars and Greenville Spinners. In 1910, he had a 1.000 fielding percentage for the Tigers, and in his lone 1922 game, he collected one hit in one at bat, for a 1.000 batting average.

Pressly also served as manager of several teams. He initially managed the Tigers in 1912 and 1913 and then the Tars for a couple years, winning pennants in 1912 and 1914. Following 1914, he left baseball to become a doctor, but later returned to the sport. He assumed the role of Greenville Spinners manager in late 1921. Pressly later served as president of the Carolina League. He also was the head coach of the Erskine College baseball team.

Medical career
Pressly became a well-known family doctor. He was named the 1948 family doctor of the year by earning the General Practitioner Award from the American Medical Association. He also served as President of the South Carolina Medical Association.

Notes

References

External links

1886 births
1954 deaths
People from Abbeville County, South Carolina
Baseball players from South Carolina
Baseball first basemen
Anderson Electricians players
Greenville Spinners players
Roanoke Tigers players
Norfolk Tars players
Minor league baseball managers
Physicians from South Carolina